First Album is the second studio album by Japanese producer Tofubeats, but his first on a major label. It was released on October 2, 2014, through Warner Music Japan subsidiary unBORDE.

Release 
The album was released on October 2, 2014. The album was preceded by two major label EP's, "Don't Stop the Music" and "Disco no Kamisama", both featuring the songs of the same names. The album includes features from artists such as Chisato Moritaka and Takashi Fujii. A remixes album, titled "First Album Remixes", was released on January 28, 2015.

Track listing

Chart positions

References 

Japanese-language albums
Tofubeats albums
Unborde albums
2014 albums